Marcelino Pérez Ayllón (born 13 August 1955 in Sabadell, Barcelona, Catalonia), known simply as Marcelino, is a Spanish retired footballer who played as a defender, mostly for Atlético Madrid.

Honours
Atlético Madrid
La Liga: 1976–77
Copa del Generalísimo: 1975–76
Copa del Rey: 1984–85
Intercontinental Cup: 1974

External links
 
 
 
 
 
 

1955 births
Living people
Sportspeople from Sabadell
Spanish footballers
Footballers from Catalonia
Association football defenders
La Liga players
Segunda División players
CE Sabadell FC footballers
Atlético Madrid footballers
UB Conquense footballers
Spain youth international footballers
Spain under-21 international footballers
Spain B international footballers
Spain international footballers
1978 FIFA World Cup players
Spanish football managers
Segunda División managers
Segunda División B managers
Cádiz CF managers